Sir Donald Cameron Runnicles OBE HonFRSE (born 16 November 1954, Edinburgh, Scotland) is a Scottish conductor.

Life and career
The son of William Runnicles, a director of a furniture supply company and a choirmaster and organist, and Christine Runnicles, he began his education at George Heriot's School in Edinburgh, moving later to George Watson's College which offered a specialised music education facility, followed by the University of Edinburgh and St John's College, Cambridge. He studied for a year at the London Opera Centre.

Runnicles began his operatic career as a singers' coach and assistant conductor in Mannheim, Germany. He became Generalmusikdirektor of the city of Freiburg, Germany in 1989. Referring to the 10 years he spent in Germany, Runnicles has said

 "I have to breathe this air, this Wagnerian air. It was life-changing and that love affair with Wagner led to what was influenced by him: the Bruckner, the Mahler."

In the USA, Runnicles served as Music Director and Principal Conductor of the San Francisco Opera from 1992 to 2009. After the conclusion of his contract, he is scheduled to continue to work with the company as a guest conductor. Runnicles has served as Principal Guest Conductor of the Atlanta Symphony Orchestra since September 2001, and his current contract there runs through 2014. From 2001 to 2007, he was also Principal Conductor of the Orchestra of St. Luke's.  Runnicles had been offered the title of Music Director of the Orchestra of St. Luke's, but he declined the title. He became Music Director of the Grand Teton Music Festival in September 2005, having been appointed that August. His Grand Teton contract was extended through 2011, and subsequently to 2019.

Runnicles first conducted the BBC Scottish Symphony Orchestra (BBC SSO) in 2001. In October 2007, the BBC SSO announced the appointment of Runnicles as their next Chief Conductor in September 2009, for an initial contract of three years. The BBC SSO appointment marks Runnicles' first principal post with a British orchestra.  In September 2011, the BBC SSO extended his contract as chief conductor through 2015.  In October 2014, the orchestra reported the scheduled conclusion of Runnicles' tenure as chief conductor in September 2016. His final concert as the BBC SSO's chief conductor was on 28 August 2016, and he now has the title of conductor emeritus of the BBC SSO.

In October 2007, the Deutsche Oper Berlin announced the appointment of Runnicles as their next Generalmusikdirektor, effective August 2009, for an initial contract of five years.  In December 2016, the company announced the newest extension of Runnicles' contract with the Deutsche Oper Berlin until 2022.  In November 2020, the Deutsche Oper Berlin announced the most recent extension of Runnicles' contract as its GMD, through 2027.

Runnicles has two daughters, Ashley and Tamara, from his past marriage to the South African violist Elizabeth Prior. and an older daughter, Alexandra, whom he fathered in Germany.  He is currently married to the Canadian pilates teacher Adelle Eslinger.

Honours and awards 
Runnicles holds an honorary doctorate from the University of Edinburgh and Royal Scottish Academy of Music and Drama, as of February 2011.  In 2019, Runnicles was elected an Honorary Fellow of the Royal Society of Edinburgh.  Runnicles was knighted in the 2020 Birthday Honours for services to music.

Discography 
 Beethoven: Symphony No. 9, Atlanta Symphony Orchestra 
 Bellini: I Capuleti e i Montecchi / Jennifer Larmore
 Britten: Peter Grimes / Metropolitan Opera DVD 2008
 Britten: Billy Budd / Bo Skovhus, Vienna Festival 2001.
 Britten: Sinfonia da Requiem / Elgar, Davies, Turnage
 Gluck: Orfeo ed Euridice (Berlioz version) / Jennifer Larmore, Dawn Upshaw, San Francisco Opera (SFO).
 Humperdinck: Hansel und Gretel / Larmore, Ziesak.
 Korngold: Die tote Stadt / Salzburg Festival 2004.
 MacMillan: Violin Concerto and Symphony No. 4/ BBC Scottish Symphony Orchestra, 2016.
 Mozart: Requiem / Levin Edition.
 Mozart: Symphony No. 39 and Symphony No. 41 "Jupiter" / Orchestra of St. Luke's, 2011.
 Orff: Carmina Burana / Hong, Atlanta.
 Puccini: Turandot / Éva Marton, Michael Sylvester. SFO. (DVD, Naxos Records)
 Strauss: Capriccio / Kiri Te Kanawa, Tatiana Troyanos, Director: Peter Maniura. SFO. (DVD)
 Strauss: Ein Heldenleben, and others / NDR SO Hamburg.
 Strauss: Four Last Songs; Wagner:  Liebestod / Christine Brewer.
 Wagner: Tristan und Isolde / Brewer, Treleaven, Rose.
 Wagner: Wesendonck Lieder; Strauss: Four Last Songs; Alban Berg: Seven Early Songs / Jane Eaglen, London Symphony Orchestra
 Wagner: Arias, Wesendonck Lieder / Jonas Kaufmann, DO
 Wagner: Der Ring des Nibelungen / 'Orchestral Scenes', Dresden Staatskapelle
 Wallace: Harvey Milk /  San Francisco Opera

References

External links
 Official website of Donald Runnicles
 BBC Scottish Symphony Orchestra
 Grand Teton Music Festival
 Interview with Donald Runnicles in Exberliner Magazine**
 Interview with Donald Runnicles by Bruce Duffie, May 1, 1995

Scottish conductors (music)
British male conductors (music)
Knights Bachelor
Conductors (music) awarded knighthoods
Music directors (opera)
Living people
1954 births
Musicians from Edinburgh
People educated at George Heriot's School
People educated at George Watson's College
Alumni of the University of Edinburgh
Alumni of St John's College, Cambridge
Officers of the Order of the British Empire
21st-century British conductors (music)
21st-century British male musicians